Holiday Hills is a village in McHenry County, Illinois, United States. Per the 2020 census, the population was 618.

Geography
Holiday Hills is located at  (42.293972, -88.226833).

Demographics

2020 census

2000 Census
As of the census of 2000, there were 831 people, 280 households, and 225 families residing in the village. The racial makeup of the village was 94.46% White, 1.20% African American, 0.36% Native American, 0.36% Asian, 0.12% Pacific Islander, 3.01% from other races, and 0.48% from two or more races. Hispanic or Latino of any race were 5.17% of the population.

There were 280 households, out of which 41.4% had children under the age of 18 living with them, 65.7% were married couples living together, 10.0% had a female householder with no husband present, and 19.3% were non-families. 13.6% of all households were made up of individuals, and 2.1% had someone living alone who was 65 years of age or older. The average household size was 2.97 and the average family size was 3.22.

In the village, the population was spread out, with 27.4% under the age of 18, 9.4% from 18 to 24, 33.2% from 25 to 44, 24.5% from 45 to 64, and 5.4% who were 65 years of age or older. The median age was 34 years. For every 100 females, there were 102.7 males. For every 100 females age 18 and over, there were 101.0 males.

The median income for a household in the village was $57,857, and the median income for a family was $61,000. Males had a median income of $40,662 versus $30,481 for females. The per capita income for the village was $20,883. None of the population or families were below the poverty line.

References

External links
Holiday Hills Web Site

Villages in McHenry County, Illinois
Villages in Illinois
Chicago metropolitan area